Kota Jantho (Jantho town) is a small town in Aceh province of Indonesia. Jantho is the seat of local government for the Aceh Besar Regency. It covers an area of 592.5 km2 and had a population of 8,443 at the 2010 Census and 9,440 at the 2020 Census. 	

Jantho became famous due to a report, when a woman was publicly whipped in accordance with Sharia law.

Climate
Jantho has a tropical rainforest climate (Af) with moderate to heavy rainfall year-round.

References

See also 

 List of regencies and cities of Indonesia
Populated places in Aceh
Regency seats of Aceh